Meta is a productive prefix in English ( in Greek) carrying a sense of transcendence or self-reference.

Meta may refer to:

Businesses
 Meta Platforms, a multinational technology company (formerly known as Facebook, Inc.)
 Meta (academic company) (2009–2022), a corporation performing analysis of scientific literature
 Meta (augmented reality company) (2013–2019), a maker of digital eyewear technology
 Meta Linhas Aéreas (formerly META), a Brazilian airline
 MetaBank, a publicly traded American bank (and division of Meta Financial)

Computing
 Meta element (<meta … >), an (X)HTML element providing a webpage's structured metadata
 Metadata, data about data
 META II, a compiler-writing language
 Meta key, a modifier key on 1970s/80s workstation keyboards
 FF Meta, a typeface
 Metasequoia (software), a 3D computer graphics package
 Metaverse, proposed networks of 3D virtual worlds for social connection
 Imagination META, a microprocessor

Music
 Meta (Assemblage 23 album), a 2007 album
 Meta (Car Bomb album), a 2016 album

People
 Meta (name)
 Pseudonym of contemporary artist Margaret Kilgallen (1967–2001)

Places

Americas
 Meta, Kentucky, United States
 Meta, Missouri, United States
 Meta Department, a department of Colombia
 Meta River, a river in Colombia

Europe
 Meta, Campania, a town in the province of Naples, Italy
 Monti della Meta, a massif in central Italy
 Meta River, a Ukrainian tributary of the Desna

Elsewhere
 Meta (district), a woreda in the Oromia Region of Ethiopia
 1050 Meta, a stony main-belt asteroid

Science and technology
 Meta- (chemistry), a positional nomenclature in aromatic ring substitution
 Meta (spider), a long-jawed orb-weaver genus
 Megachannel ExtraTerrestrial Assay, a predecessor to the SETI project
 META fuel, a solid fuel

Other uses
 Meta (mythology), first wife of Aegeus, mythical king of Athens
 Meta (Roman circus), a pole marking racetrack turns
 Meta' language, spoken in Cameroon
 Middle East Theatre Academy, Sharjah, United Arab Emirates
 The Meta, an antagonist in the machinima series Red vs. Blue

See also 

 
 Metta (disambiguation)
 Metagaming (disambiguation)
 Metanoia (theology)
 Metastasis, in medicine